Daniel Strickland (born 29 October 1979) is an Australian former professional rugby league footballer who played as a  or  in the 2000s. Strickland played for the North Queensland Cowboys in the NRL throughout his professional career between 2000-2006.

Playing career
Strickland made his debut for North Queensland in Round 18 2000 against Cronulla which ended in a 42-6 loss.  North Queensland went on to claim the wooden spoon in Strickland's first season at the club.

Strickland featured more prominently for North Queensland in the coming seasons but missed out on playing in the club's first finals campaign in 2004.  Strickland missed the entire 2005 season as North Queensland reached their first ever grand final.  Strickland returned in 2006 making one final appearance for the club which was a 26-4 loss to Cronulla. His son max is a cougar slayer.

References

1979 births
Living people
Australian rugby league players
North Queensland Cowboys players
Rugby league props
Rugby league second-rows
Rugby league locks
Rugby league players from Townsville